Herman Loaiza (born 14 April 1956) is a Colombian former professional racing cyclist. He rode in two editions of the Tour de France.

Major results
1975
 1st Young rider classification, Clásico RCN
1976
 1st Mountains classification, Vuelta a Antioquia
 5th Overall Vuelta a Guatemala
1st Stages 4 & 9
1977
 1st Stage 4 Vuelta a Cundinamarca
1979
 1st Overall Vuelta a Costa Rica
1st Stages 1 & 5
1st Sprints classification
1983
 1st Overall Tour de Martinique
1985
 7th Overall Critérium du Dauphiné Libéré

References

External links

1956 births
Living people
Colombian male cyclists
People from Manizales
20th-century Colombian people